Damian Gonzalo Facciuto (born November 17, 1972 in Buenos Aires, Argentina) is a former professional footballer. He played as a defensive midfielder.

External links

1972 births
Living people
Argentine footballers
Association football midfielders
Argentinos Juniors footballers
Racing Club de Avellaneda footballers
Rosario Central footballers
Chamois Niortais F.C. players
Instituto footballers
Ligue 2 players
Argentine Primera División players
Argentine expatriate footballers
Footballers from Buenos Aires